Patty Ryan is a German singer best known for her Eurodisco song "You're My Love, You're My Life" from 1986. She also sang the hits "Stay With Me Tonight", "Love is the Name of the Game", and "I Don't Wanna Lose You Tonight" (all from her debut album Love is the Name of the Game). Her style is similar to that of bands like Modern Talking, London Boys, and Bad Boys Blue. Some of the songs from her debut album resemble Modern Talking songs considerably, You're My Love, You're My Life (You're My Heart, You're My Soul), I'm Feeling So Blue (There's Too Much Blue In Missing You), and the song Chinese Eyes even is based around melodies from "You're My Heart, You're My Soul". She also sang Danuta Lato's hit "Touch My Heart".

Ryan had her start in music business with the rockabilly formation Susi & die Rockets, which also participated in the ZDF-Hitparade in 1981 with the song Dieses Haus ist kein Bahnhof (German version of Sweet Lolita from the British rockabilly band Matchbox).

Patty Ryan's newest releases are the 2005 CD single "I Gave You All My Love", the 2006 compilation All the Best (Otre-Media), the hits "Ohne Zweifel" (2004), and "Lass mir doch mal meinen Spass" (2005) in Germany.

Discography
Love Is the Name of the Game (1987)
Top of the Line (1988)	
Lay Love On You  (2003)	
All the Best (2006)

References

External links
Official homepage
Russian Official website

German women singers
Living people
Eurodisco musicians
German Italo disco musicians
1961 births